Maharajadhiraj Mirza Maharao Sri Sir Vijayarajaji Khengarji Sawai Bahadur, GBE (2 September 1885 – 26 February 1948) was the ruling Rao of Kutch from 1942 to his death in 1948.
 
As Yuvraj, Sir Vijayrajaji worked closely with his father, Khengarji III, and often was left to administer the state during his father's frequent journeys abroad.

He was married on 6 March 1907 to HH Maharani Shri Padmakunwar Ba Sahiba, daughter of HH Maharao Kesari Singhji Bahadur of Sirohi and had several issues.

He built upon his father's reforms, instituting the Kutch High Court, elected village councils and greatly expanded irrigation works and agricultural development in the state during short span of six years of his rule. He took keen interest in irrigation projects and took advice of experts for the matter and it was during his reign the famous Vijaysagar reservoir was built with an irrigation capacity of almost 4047 hectors. A total of 22 dams, mostly earthen, were constructed during his reign of six years, which even today stand to test of time.  Also in his reign Kutch became the third princely state after Hyderabad and Travancore to start its own bus transport services beginning in year 1945. Sir Vijayrajaji was a botanist and ornithologist. In years 1942–45, he funded and facilitated Salim Ali's survey of the birds of Kutch. He enjoyed cricket, football, tennis, sculling and loved going on shikar.  

He preferred to live  in the Vijay Vilas Palace at Mandvi, which was built during reign of his father Maharaja Kehngarji, for him in year 1929 and was named after him.

He was awarded Knight Grand Cross of the Most Excellent Order of the British Empire by British in 1945.

In year 1947, upon advice of Mahatma Gandhi,  of land was donated by Shri Vijayrajji for re-settlement of refugee Hindu Sindhi community, who had migrated across the border into Kutch from Sindh area of Pakistan upon partition of India. The towns of Gandhidham and Adipur were developed on this land donated by him.

He acceded the Princely State of Cutch to the Dominion of India on 16 August 1947, which thus became the first princely state to accede into India. As he was in London at the time India gained independence, he took a decision from there only and the Instrument of Accession of Kutch was signed on his behalf by his heir & son Meghraji, on his behalf. He died on 26 January 1948, aged  62 and was succeeded by his eldest son and Yuvraj, Meghraji. His youngest son, Himmatsinhji, was also noted and earned a name as ornithologist and served as member of 3rd Lok Sabha for Kutch constituency.

The Chhatri of Vijayarajaji, his cenotaph, is located within campus of Vijaya Vilas Palace at Mandavi.

Titles

1885-1942: Maharajkumar Shri Vijayrajsinhji Khengarji, Yuvraj Sahib of Cutch
1942-1945: Colonel His Highness Maharajadhiraj Mirza Maharao Shri Vijayarajji Sawai Bahadur, Maharao of Cutch
1945-1948: Colonel His Highness Maharajadhiraj Mirza Maharao Shri Sir Vijayarajji Sawai Bahadur, Maharao of Cutch, GBE

Honours

Delhi Durbar Medal (Silver) - 1911
King George V Silver Jubilee Medal, 1935
King George VI Coronation Medal, 1937
Knight Grand Cross of the Order of the British Empire (GBE), 1945
Indian Independence Medal, 1947

Political Office

References

Indian Knights Grand Cross of the Order of the British Empire
1885 births
1948 deaths
Maharajas of Kutch
Hindu monarchs
Indian royalty
Indian Hindus
Indian ornithologists
Indian naturalists
20th-century Indian botanists
19th-century Indian zoologists
20th-century Indian zoologists
19th-century Indian botanists
Scientists from Gujarat
20th-century Indian philanthropists
20th-century naturalists